Dover Seaways (previously Maersk Dover) is a Ro-Ro passenger ferry owned by DFDS Seaways and operated between Dover and Dunkerque. The ship was built for Norfolkline and was operated as Maersk Dover from 2006 to 2010 between Dover and Dunkerque.

In July 2010, DFDS Seaways purchased Norfolkline from Maersk, with the ship being renamed Dover Seaways and being rebranded in DFDS branding. Despite the takeover, Dover Seaways continued on the Dover-Dunkerque route.

Accidents & Incidents

2014 Dock collision 
On 9 November 2014, Dover Seaways collided with a harbour wall at the Port of Dover, shortly after leaving the port at 08:00. The ship was heading to Dunkirk carrying 320 passengers. Several passengers were treated with minor injuries, and four were taken to hospital for additional treatment.

References

Dover Seaways
2005 ships
Ships built by Samsung Heavy Industries